Doc Society (formerly Channel 4 BRITDOC Foundation and BRITDOC Foundation) is a social entrepreneurship organisation created in 2005. They have supported the production of over 60 films that have won awards .

Development
Initially supported by UK broadcaster Channel 4 to support British documentaries declined by broadcast commissioners, the BRITDOC Foundation has grown to receive further funding from NGOs, brands and foundations such as PUMA.Creative and the Bertha Foundation to invest in the support of documentary film. The Foundation also works in other areas of film funding by creating the pitching forum 'Good Pitch' and popular film torrent site VODO. Their mission is to support international documentary film from production to distribution to outreach. The Foundation is headed by three directors: Jess Search, Beadie Finzi and Maxyne Franklin.

Documentary titles
Documentary titles the Foundation has supported include The Bengali Detective by Phillip Cox, Hell and Back Again by Danfung Dennis, Self Made by Gillian Wearing, The Yes Men Fix the World by Mike Bonanno, Andy Bichlbaum & Kurt Engfehr, Erasing David by filmmaker David Bond (d.) Ashley Jones (p.), Sounds Like Teen Spirit: a Popumentary by Jamie Jay Johnson, Moving to Mars by Mat Whitecross (d.) and Karen Katz (p.), The End of the Line by Rupert Murray, The Solitary life of Cranes by Eva Weber, Afghan Star by Havana Marking, We Are Together Paul Taylor (d.) and Teddy Leifer (p.) and Here's Johnny by Adam Lavis, Kat Mansoor and Will Hood.

As a result of the long-term partnership initiated in 2010 between BRITDOC Foundation and PUMA.Creative, a growing number of international films concerned with the themes of social justice, peace and environmental issues have received funding and support.

The following films were winners of the PUMA.Creative Catalyst Award: Speed Sisters by Geoffrey Smith, DRAGONSLAYER by Tristan Patterson, Teenage by Matt Wolf, Charlie PELE by F. Simiyu Barasa, Shadow Girl by Maria Teresa Larrain, Beyond the Wave by Kyoko Miyake, I, Afrikaner by Annalet Steenkamp, Femme à la Camera by Karima Zoubir.

PUMA.Creative Mobility Award winners: Ai Weiwei: Never Sorry by Alison Klayman, Fish Fight Europe by William Anderson, Who is Dayani Cristal? by Marc Silver, A Small Act by Jennifer Arnold, Turkey Creek by Leah Mahan, The Island President by Jon Shenk, Ping Pong by Hugh Hartford, 25 to Life by Mike Brown, Moving to Mars by Matt Whitecross (this film provided the inspiration for the song "Moving to Mars" by Coldplay).

Good Pitch
Good Pitch is a documentary pitching platform established at the BRITDOC Film Festival in 2008. It is a partnership between The Channel 4 BRITDOC Foundation and The Sundance Institute Documentary Film Program. The international platform brings together filmmakers with NGOs, foundations, philanthropists, brands and media around leading social issues – to forge coalitions and campaigns for the benefit of all parties. To date, more than 90 documentary projects have been presented at Good Pitch events in London, Oxford, New York City, Washington, D.C., Toronto, San Francisco and Johannesburg. In that time more than 1,500 organisations have attended.

Additionally in 2011, BRITDOC Foundation launched a satellite version of the forum, called Good Pitch² (Good Pitch Squared). With the same mission as their flagship events – to 'connect good films to good people'. The first Good Pitch² was held by the People to People (P2P) International Documentary Conference in Johannesburg on 13 September 2011. Good Pitch² events have been hosted in India, Argentina, Taiwan, Australia with events scheduled for Kenya and Southeast Asia.

Recently the Bertha Foundation has partnered with the BRITDOC Foundation to launch two new funds for documentary feature films totalling £1.5 million over three years. The funds are available for journalism documentaries and documentary outreach campaigns.

References

External links 
 http://britdoc.org/

Television festivals
Documentary film festivals in the United Kingdom
Documentary film organizations
Film festivals in England
2005 establishments in the United Kingdom
Organizations established in 2005
Social enterprises
Film organisations in the United Kingdom